Seksan Piturat (also written Sakesan Pituratana) or the nickname  "James" is a Thai former football player, who has been described as the "Ronaldo" of Thai football. He played as a striker for Thailand national team in various tournaments such as World Cup 2002 (Qualifying), Asian Cup 2000 and scored 19 goals for the national team. He previously played in the Thailand Division 1 League with Royal Thai Police FC.

International goals

References

External links
 Unofficial Seksan Piturat Homepage

1976 births
Living people
Seksan Piturat
Seksan Piturat
2000 AFC Asian Cup players
Seksan Piturat
Seksan Piturat
Seksan Piturat
Seksan Piturat
Seksan Piturat
Seksan Piturat
Seksan Piturat
Seksan Piturat
Association football forwards
Seksan Piturat
Southeast Asian Games medalists in football
Competitors at the 1999 Southeast Asian Games